Madurai Metro, is a proposed rapid transit system for Madurai, Tamil Nadu.

History
The Government of Tamilnadu proposed for a Metro Rail in Madurai, the second largest city in the state of Tamilnadu.CMRL releases tender notice for preparing the project's  feasibility report in March, 2022 and BARSYL bags the tender to prepare feasibility study with the deadline of May, 2022

DFR Completion (13.November.2022) 
Madurai metro rail will cover 29km with 17 stations in phase 1
A higher official with the CMRL said, “As the DFR has been completed and following several deliberations, we are ready to submit the DFR to the State government within a week. Post the approval from the government, we will be initiating DPR soon, wrapping it up in four to five months duration.”
For the Madurai Metro rail project, phase 1 is set to cover a length of 29 kilometres with 17 stations. More stations are likely to be identified while undertaking the Detailed Project Report (DPR) in the coming months for the Mass Rapid Transit System (MRTS), said official sources.
Meanwhile, as the Detailed Feasibility Report (DFR) has been recently completed by the Balaji Rail Road Systems (BARSYL), the Chennai Metro Rail Limited (CMRL) is set to submit the DFR for approval to the Tamil Nadu government within a week.
A higher official with the CMRL said, “As the DFR has been completed and following several deliberations, we are ready to submit the DFR to the State government within a week. Post the approval from the government, we will be initiating DPR soon, wrapping it up in four to five months duration.”
“For the 29-km distance in phase 1, the route has been planned from Otthakadai through areas like Mattuthavani, Pudur to Tirumangalam in elevated lines. However, due to the presence of the prominent temple in the area, suggestions have also been placed for underground lines near Vaigai River and Periyar bus stand,” added the official.
Subsequently, for phase 2, the proposal includes locations such as Tirumangalam, Madurai Airport, and Therkuvasal ultimately connecting to corridor 1 of phase 1.
The 10 important stations earmarked as per DFR include Otthakadai station, Madurai High Court station, Pudur station, Simmakal station, Madurai junction Metro station, Pasumalai station, Thiru Nagar station, Thoppur station, Kappalur and Thirumangalam Metro stations.
“The number of stations will likely be added during the DPR and the construction. However, of the 17 stations in the 29 km distance, 10 stations in important locations have been earmarked as per the footfall and feasibility,” observed the official.

Project timeline
2021: Tamil Nadu Government announces metro rail projects for Tier II cities such as Madurai
2022: BARSYL bags the tender to prepare feasibility study for the mass rapid transportation system in Madurai
2022 November: DFR Proposal

See Also 
Chennai Metro
Coimbatore Metro

References

Transport in Madurai
Standard gauge railways in India
Proposed rapid transit in India
Proposed infrastructure in Tamil Nadu